Metaniidae is a family of freshwater sponges, with five genera and 26 species:
 Acalle Gray, 1867
 Acalle recurvata (Bowerbank, 1863)
 Corvomeyenia Weltner, 1913
 Corvomeyenia carolinensis Harrison, 1971
 Corvomeyenia epilithosa Volkmer-Ribeiro, Rosa-Barbosa & Machado, 2005
 Corvomeyenia everetti (Mills, 1884)
 Corvomeyenia thumi (Traxler, 1895)
 Drulia Gray, 1867
 Drulia batesii (Bowerbank, 1863)
 Drulia brownii (Bowerbank, 1863)
 Drulia conifera Bonetto & Ezcurra de Drago, 1973
 Drulia cristata (Weltner, 1895)
 Drulia ctenosclera Volkmer & Mothes, 1981
 Drulia geayi (Gravier, 1899)
 Drulia uruguayensis Bonetto & Ezcurra de Drago, 1969
 Houssayella Bonetto & Ezcurra de Drago, 1966
 Houssayella iguazuensis Bonetto & Ezcurra de Drago, 1966
 Metania Gray, 1867
 Metania fittkaui Volkmer-Ribeiro, 1979
 Metania godeauxi (Brien, 1968)
 Metania kiliani Volkmer-Ribeiro & Costa, 1992
 Metania madagascariensis Manconi & Pronzato, 2015
 Metania melloleitaoi Machado, 1948
 Metania ovogemata Stanisic, 1979
 Metania pottsi (Weltner, 1895)
 Metania reticulata (Bowerbank, 1863)
 Metania rhodesiana Burton, 1938
 Metania spinata (Carter, 1881)
 Metania subtilis Volkmer, 1979
 Metania vesparioides (Annandale, 1908)
 Metania vesparium (Martens, 1868)

References

Haplosclerida